Natalya Anatoliyivna Vorozhbyt (born 4 April 1975) is a Ukrainian playwright and screenwriter.

Life 
Vorozhbyt graduated in 2000 from the Maxim Gorky Literature Institute. She has also studied at the International Writers Program.

She writes her scripts in both Russian and Ukrainian.

Together with the German director Georg Zheno she founded the Theater of the Displaced, where refugees from Donbas can tell their stories, and curated the Class Act project. She wrote the screenplay for the feature film Cyborgs about the defense of Sergei Prokoviev Airport near Donetsk, where Ukrainian soldiers fought for 242 days against separatists. Vorozhbyt traveled through the war zone for four months and spoke with those involved. The war situation in Ukraine is a frequent theme in her work.

She took part in the 2013 Euromaidan protests. During this time she also collected inspiration for new work. She has previously collaborated with the Royal Court Theatre and Royal Shakespeare Company.

In February 2022, Vorozhbyt was working on her latest film 'Demons' in Myrhorod and had only four days of production to complete; it is about a relationship between a Russian and Ukrainian, reflecting what she called the 'uneasy' international relations between these nations, when the city she was in came under bombardment during the Russian invasion. She was interviewed in a bomb shelter on 25 February 2022, saying that it was 'very important for me to be here' but admitting she may have to leave the country if Russia took over. Her interpretation of these events is that it began thirty years ago when Ukraine was being established as an independent country and allowed the Russian influence in Donbas to grow. She appealed for international community support for Ukraine.

Works 

 The Khomenko Family Chronicles, 2006. Royal Court Theatre
 The Grain Store, 2009, 
 Bad Roads, 2017. 
 My Mykolaivka, 2017
Blood Sisters, 2019
Bad Roads, 2020

References

External links 
 
 SEGAL TALKS: Natalia Vorozhbit, 12 May 2020

1975 births
Living people
Ukrainian screenwriters
Maxim Gorky Literature Institute alumni
Laureates of the Oleksandr Dovzhenko State Prize